Major Edgar “Paddy”  O'Ballance (17 July 1918, Dublin, Ireland – 8 July 2009, Wakebridge, Derbyshire, England) was an Irish-born British military journalist, researcher,  defence commentator and academic lecturer specialising in international relations and defence problems.

He was emergency commissioned a Second Lieutenant from Sergeant in the Sherwood Foresters on 19 January 1941.
As a temporary Major he was mentioned in dispatches for service in Palestine between 27 March and 30 June 1948.

He served in the British army until 1948.

In April 1953 he was commissioned into the Territorial Army as a captain, serving with the Sherwood Foresters. He was promoted major in March 1955. In June 1963 he transferred from the Sherwood Foresters to the General List. In July 1965 he was awarded the Territorial Efficiency Decoration.

In 1968 he transferred from the General List (Territorial Army) to the General List (Regular Army Reserve of Officers) and having achieved the age limit on 17 July 1968 (his 50th birthday) retired retaining the rank of major.

He worked as a journalist for a US Wire Agency from 1948 to 1962, and was thereafter a freelance journalist. He covered over twenty wars and insurgencies and wrote extensively on international relations, defence and strategic problems. He was a member of the International Institute for Strategic Studies and Chairman of the London-based Military Commentators' Circle. He wrote many articles for military journals and was the author of over forty books.

Mad dog of the Middle East
O'Ballance was the originator of the phrase "mad dog of the Middle East" when referring to Muammar al-Gaddafi while on the lecture circuit in the USA. The then-U.S. president, Ronald Reagan, picked it up and used the phrase himself in April 1986.

Books
No Victor, No Vanquished: the Yom Kippur War  
Malaya: The Communist insurgent war, 1948–1960
The Arab-Israeli War 1948
The Sinai Campaign, 1956
The Red Army
The Red Army of China
The Story of the French Foreign Legion
The Indo-China War, 1945–54
The Greek Civil War, 1944-1949 - 1966
The Algerian Insurrection 1954-1962 - 1967
Korea: 1950-1953 - 1969 
The War In Yemen - 1971
The Third Arab-Israeli war - 1972
The Kurdish Revolt: 1961-1970 - 1973
Arab guerilla power, 1967-1972 - 1974
The Electronic War in the Middle East, 1968-70 - 1974
The secret war in the Sudan, 1955-1972 - 1977
Language of Violence: The blood politics of terrorism - 1979
The Wars in Vietnam - 1981
The US rapid deployment force - 1981
Terror in Ireland: The Heritage of Hate - 1984
The Gulf War - 1988
Civil War in Bosnia, 1992-94 - 1995. 
Wars in the Caucasus, 1990-1995 - 1997. 
The Palestinian Intifada 1998
Civil War in Lebanon, 1975-92 - 1998. 
The Congo-Zaire experience, 1960-98 - 2000. 
Afghan Wars: 1839 To the Present Day - 2002. 
The cyanide war : Tamil insurrection in Sri Lanka, 1973-88. London: Brassey's (UK). .

See also
Black July
Lebanese Civil War

References

External links
 
 Boy soldier explored perils of changing world.

1918 births
2009 deaths
British male journalists
British military writers
British military historians
Sherwood Foresters officers